The Schweizerische Gesellschaft für Neue Musik (SGNM; French Société Suisse de Musique Contemporaine, SSMC; Italian Società Svizzera per la Musica Contemporanea, SSMC; English. ISCM Switzerland) is a national section of the International Society for Contemporary Music (ISCM). It is organised as an association and has its legal domicile in Lausanne.

History 
The IGNM Switzerland was founded in October 1922 on the initiative of the Winterthur patron Werner Reinhart as one of the world's first ISCM country sections. Reinhart, as 1st ISCM Secretary General, had already been instrumental in the founding of the umbrella organisation in June 1922. The founding president of IGNM Switzerland was the composer and conductor Volkmar Andreae from Zurich. From 1946 until 2001, on an initiative of Paul Sacher, IGNM Switzerland shared the secretariat together with the Swiss . Its aim is the promotion Neue Musik.

The Swiss IGNM local groups in Basel, Bern, Lausanne, La Chaux-de-Fonds, Lucerne, Central Switzerland, St. Gallen and Valais as well as various festivals and ensembles for New Music are members of the SGNM.

To date, the association has hosted the ISCM World Music Days a total of six times: 1926 (Zurich), 1929 (Geneva), 1957 (Zurich), 1970 (Basel), 1991 (Zurich) and the  under the direction of Mathias Steinauer with the motto "Trans it".

The annals of the World Music Days in Switzerland include several world premieres of music-historical significance, among them the highly acclaimed 1926 premiere of Anton Webern's 5 orchestral pieces op. 10 under his direction, and in 1957 in Zurich, the staged premiere of Arnold Schoenberg's opera fragment Moses und Aron. In 1957 - also in Zurich - electronic music was played for the first time in the history of the ISCM World Music Days.

List of presidents 
Volkmar Andreae (1922, until 1928 in personal union with the STV Presidium), Hans Ehinger (1934, ad interim), Paul Sacher (1935, from 1946 in personal union with the STV Presidium), Samuel Baud-Bovy (1955, in personal union with the STV Presidium),  (1960, in personal union with the STV Presidium), Constantin Regamey (1963, in personal union with the STV Presidium), Hermann Haller (1968, in personal union with the STV Presidium), Julien-François Zbinden (1973, in personal union with the STV Presidium), Francis Travis (1974), Fritz Muggler (1978), Jean-Luc Darbellay (1995), Max E. Keller (2007), Nicolas Farine (2010), Javier Hagen (2014). (Year of inception in brackets)

Further reading 
Anton Haefeli: Die Internationale Gesellschaft für Neue Musik – Ihre Geschichte von 1922 bis zur Gegenwart. Atlantis Musikbuch-Verlag, Zürich 1982, .
Joseph Willimann: pro Musica – der neuen Musik zulieb. 50 Jahre Pro Musica, Ortsgruppe Zürich der Internationalen Gesellschaft für Neue Musik. Atlantis Musikbuch, Zürich 1988, .
Thomas Meyer: World Music Days Zürich 1991 / Weltmusiktage Zürich 1991 – Programm. Swiss Society for Contemporary Music c/o SAFIMM, NZZ Fretz AG, Schlieren 1991.
B. Geller, M. Favre, A. Briner, P.-A. Gaillard: Tendances et réalisations – volume commémoratif publié à l’occasion du 75e anniversaire de l’Association des musiciens suisses, 1900–1975. Schweizerischer Tonkünstlerverein/Association Suisse des Musiciens, Atlantis Musikbuch Verlag, Zürich 1975, .

References

External links 
 

Music organisations based in Switzerland
Organisations based in Lausanne
1922 establishments in Switzerland